Ştefan Birtalan (born 25 September 1948) is a former Romanian handball player, coach and sports official.

Birtalan was one of the best players of his time and was named the World Player of the Year in 1974, 1976 and 1977. He spent most of his club career with Steaua București, winning with them 12 Romanian championships and the European Champions Cup in 1977. He also won the world title in 1970 and 1974, becoming the top scorer at the 1974 tournament with 43 goals. He participated in the 1972, 1976 and 1980 Olympics winning one silver and bronze medals.

Biography
Birtalan is of Hungarian descent through his father István. His mother was Romanian and her name was Valeria.

As a teenager he trained in handball, volleyball, basketball and athletics. He debuted in handball aged 16 with the team Rapid CFR Jibou. In 1966, he moved to Baia Mare to study civil engineering. There he first played volleyball and in 1967 changed to handball. From 1970 to 1985 he competed for Steaua Bucharest, with an interruption between 1981 and 1983. With Steaua he won the 1977 EHF Champions League title, finishing second in 1971, and 12 national titles. In 1966, he was included to the junior and in 1968 to the senior national handball team.

At the end of his career Birtalan spent one year in Italy as player-coach in 1985–86. After returning to Romania he worked with the national junior team, and in 1991–1994 was head coach at Steaua. In 1994 he accepted a coaching position in Qatar. Between 1999 and 2002 he again coached Steaua, bringing it to the national titles in 2000 and 2001. In 2002 he retired from coaching due to health problems, and became a sport administrator.

International achievements
EHF Champions League:
Winner: 1977
Finalist: 1971
World Championship:
Gold Medalist: 1970, 1974
Summer Olympics:
Silver Medalist: 1976 
Bronze Medalist: 1972, 1980
World University Championship:
Gold Medalist: 1973, 1975

National achievements

Player
Steaua București
Romanian National League:
Winner: 1971, 1972, 1973, 1974, 1975, 1976, 1977, 1979, 1980, 1981, 1984, 1985
Romanian Cup:
Winner: 1981, 1985

Manager
Steaua București
Romanian National League:
Winner: 1987, 1988, 1989, 1990, 2000, 2001
Romanian Cup:
Winner: 1990, 2000, 2001

Individual awards and honours
IHF
 3× IHF World Player of the Year: 1974, 1976, 1977
 World Championship Top Scorer: 1974 
 Summer Olympics Top Scorer: 1976

National
 3× Romanian Sportsman of the Year: 1974, 1976, 1977

References

External links

 
 
 
 

1948 births
Living people
People from Jibou
Romanian people of Hungarian descent
Romanian male handball players
Romanian handball coaches
CSA Steaua București (handball) players
Handball players at the 1972 Summer Olympics
Handball players at the 1976 Summer Olympics
Handball players at the 1980 Summer Olympics
Olympic handball players of Romania
Olympic silver medalists for Romania
Olympic bronze medalists for Romania
Olympic medalists in handball
Medalists at the 1980 Summer Olympics
Medalists at the 1976 Summer Olympics
Medalists at the 1972 Summer Olympics
Romanian sportspeople of Hungarian descent